The 2007 CIS Men's Final 8 Basketball Tournament was held March 16–18, 2007. It was held for the last time at the Halifax Metro Centre in Halifax, Nova Scotia. The Carleton Ravens won their fifth straight national title.

Bracket

Tournament Awards
MVP: Aaron Doornekamp, Carleton
All-stars:
Osvaldo Jeanty, Carleton
Dany Charlery, Brandon
David Yul Michel, Brandon
Josh Gibson-Bascombe, Ottawa
Mark McLaughlin, Saint Mary's

2007
2006–07 in Canadian basketball